Srikhanda is a village in Srikhanda gram panchayat in Katwa I CD block in  Katwa subdivision of Purba Bardhaman district. It is about  distance from Katwa and  distance from Burdwan.

Geography

Urbanisation
88.44% of the population of Katwa subdivision lives in the rural areas. Only 11.56% of the population lives in the urban areas. The map alongside presents some of the notable locations in the subdivision. All places marked in the map are linked in the larger full screen map.

Gram panchayats
The villages under Srikhanda gram panchayat are Srikhanda, Debkundu, Nahata, Bagtona, Barnagra, Chandrakota, Kadampukur and Ganguly danga.

In the past Srikhanda Gram Panchayat was under 280 Katwa (Vidhan Sabha constituency) but after Delimitation Commission it is now under 271, Ketugram Vidhansabha constituency and in 41, Bolpur (Lok Sabha constituency) Lok Sabha constituency. The pincode no of Srikhanda is 713150 and std code is (+91) 03453.

Demographics
As per the 2011 Census of India Srikhanda had a total population of 18,394, of which 9,456 (51%) were males and 8,938 (49%) were females. Population below 6 years was 2,517. The total number of literates in Srikhanda was 10,100 (63.61% of the population over 6 years).

Transport
There is a station at Srikhanda on the Bardhaman-Katwa line.

Education
Srikhanda High School, a Bengali-medium boys only school was established in 1908. Apart from this there is a girls only high school and several other primary and pre-primary school providing quality education.

Culture
There are two Shiva temples named Lord Dugddho Kumar Shiv Temple and Shri Shri Bhoothnathjeur Mandir in this village. Prabhu Nityananda hailed from this village. Narahari Sarkar Thakura  was born in Srikhanda. The place where Prabhu Narahari used to rest is called Bilas Kunja of Narahari Sarkar or better known as Baradanga where Locana Dasa Thakura the dear disciple of Narahari Sarkar wrote his book Chaitanya Mangala. Srikhanda Thakurbari  has temple of Lord Krishna situated in the middle of the village. The villagers of Srikhanda call it 'Khandabasi'.

Healthcare
Srikhanda block primary health centre at Srikhanda (with 15 beds) is the main medical facility in Katwa I CD block. Katwa Subdivisional Hospital at Katwa, with 250 beds is located outside the CD block. There are primary health centres at Chandrapur (with 10 beds), Kaithan (with 6 beds) and Sudpur (with 6 beds). In 2012, the average monthly patients attending Srikhanda BPHC were 2,876 and average monthly admissions were 39. It handled 277 annual emergency admissions.

Library
A Government authorised library named 'Srikhanda Chittaranjan Pathamandir' is located in this village. This library is enriched with over 11,000 books and 
several rare manuscripts.

See also - Healthcare in West Bengal

References

Villages in Purba Bardhaman district